Đô Lương is a rural district of Nghệ An province in the North Central Coast region of Vietnam. As of 2003 the district had a population of 193,890. The district covers an area of 354 km². The district capital lies at Đô Lương.

References

Districts of Nghệ An province